Longside railway station was a railway station in Longside, Aberdeenshire.

History
The station was opened on 3 July 1862. On the north side was the goods yard. There were two signal boxes, North and South, both opening in 1890. The north signal box was at the west end of the westbound platform and the south signal box was at the east end of the eastbound platform. After resignalling in 1918, the south signal box closed. The north signal box was renamed to Longside box. The station was closed to passengers under the Beeching Axe on 3 May 1965. The signal box closed along with it. The tracks were lifted in 1970.

References 

 

Disused railway stations in Aberdeenshire
Beeching closures in Scotland
Former Great North of Scotland Railway stations
Railway stations in Great Britain opened in 1862
Railway stations in Great Britain closed in 1965
1862 establishments in Scotland
1965 disestablishments in Scotland